ARA Alférez Sobral (A-9) is an 800-ton ocean-going tug that was in service with the Argentine Navy from 1972 until 2019, where she was classified as an aviso. She had previously served in the  US Navy as the fleet tug . In Argentine service an aviso is a small naval vessel used for a number of auxiliary tasks, including tugging, laying buoys, and replenishing other ships, lighthouses and naval bases.

US Navy service

Built by  Levingston Shipbuilding Co., at Orange, Texas as a Sotoyomo-class rescue tug, she served as USS Salish (ATA-187) from 1944 to 1972.

Argentine Navy service

The ship was named after Antarctic explorer Alférez José María Sobral (1880–1961). She was acquired on 10 February 1972 along with her sister-ship  from Mayport, Florida on 6 March 1972 and arriving to Puerto Belgrano on 18 April.

Falklands War
In the early hours of 3 May 1982, the vessel was hit by at least two Sea Skua anti-ship missiles fired by British Westland Lynx HAS.Mk.2/3 helicopters.

The Alférez Sobral was initially spotted by a Westland Sea King helicopter. When the helicopter approached to investigate and was engaged by Alférez Sobral's fore Oerlikon cannon. The helicopter retreated and requested an armed response.

In response  and  launched their Westland Lynx HAS.Mk.2/3 helicopters. Coventry Lynx (XZ242) attacked first, firing two Sea Skua (air-to-surface) anti-ship missiles. One of the missiles narrowly missed the bridge, the second hit Alférez Sobral fibreglass motorboat, injuring the crew of a 20 mm cannon and knocking out the radio aerials.

Twenty minutes later Glasgow Lynx (XZ247) launched two more missiles, at least one of which struck the bridge, causing extensive damage. The attack killed eight of the crew—including the ship's captain, Lieutenant Commander Sergio Gómez Roca—and injured eight. The Alférez Sobral lost all her electrical power, radio, radar and compass; she had no working navigational aids other than a landing compass, unsuitable for sailing.

She was found and helped by a Sikorsky S-61N LV-OCL (a civilian  helicopter requisitioned by the Argentine Air Force as part of Escuadron Fenix  and piloted by First Lieutenant Lucero) which evacuated the injured.  Alférez Sobral was then assisted by the civilian trawler María Alejandra and finally reached Puerto Deseado on 5 May. The attack had occurred at the approximated position .

Post-war 
From 1993 Alférez Sobral was based at Ushuaia; in February 2010 she moved to Mar del Plata  switching places with ARA Gurruchaga. In 2001 she assisted the expedition ship Caledonian Star which had been struck by a rogue wave during transit of the Drake Passage. She remained in service until 2018.

Legacy 
The ship survived the conflict and remained in naval service until August 2018. There are plans to preserve Alférez Sobral as a museum ship in Santa Fe. In 2022 it was reported that she might be placed on the disposal list. The ship's badly damaged bridge is currently on display at the Naval Museum in Tigre, Buenos Aires Province, Argentina. 

Argentina's final Espora class corvette was renamed  to honour Sobral'''s captain, Sergio Raul Goméz Roca, the first commander of an Argentine ship to be killed in action since the war with Brazil in the 19th century. The aviso ARA Teniente Olivieri (A-2) is named after the guardamarina (midshipman) Claudio Olivieri, also killed in the action and posthumously promoted to lieutenant.

Specifications
ARA (A-9) Alférez Sobral, Sotoyomo-class avisoThe US Sotoyomo-class were fleet tugs; this vessel was classified as an aviso in Argentine service
Displacement 835 tonnes
Length 43.6 m
Beam 10.3 m
Draught 2.2 m
Propulsion 2 GM 12-278 A diesel-electric  2200 HP engines, 2 1500 HP generators, 1 propeller
Cruising speed 8 kn
Maximum speed 13 kn
Range 16,500 nm
Armament 1 Bofors 40/60 C cannon, 2 x 20mm Oerlikon cannons
Crew: 46

 References 

 Notes 

 Bibliography 
 The Fight for the Malvinas'', Martin Middlebrook,

External links 
 Histarmar Site pictorial 
 naval-history.net: Details of the Falklands War incident
 nafts.org: Pictures of the damage done by the Sea Skua missiles
  ARA official website: Side view (profile) of ARA Alférez Sobral
  ARA official website: Technical Specifications of ARA Alférez Sobral

1944 ships
Falklands War naval ships of Argentina
Sotoyomo-class tugs of the Argentine Navy
Ships transferred from the United States Navy to the Argentine Navy
Maritime incidents in 1982